Biology is a quarterly, peer-reviewed, open access, scientific journal covering research on all aspects of biology. It was established in 2012 and is published by MDPI. The editor-in-chief is Chris O'Callaghan (University of Oxford). The journal publishes reviews, research papers, and communications.

Biology publishes reviews, research papers and communications in all areas of biology and at the interface of related disciplines. It´s aim is to encourage scientists to publish their experimental and theoretical results in as much detail as possible.

This journal covers all topics related to Biology. Research fields of interest include but are not limited to:

• bacteriology 

• biochemistry 

• biodiversity 

• bioethics

Abstracting and indexing 
The journal is abstracted and indexed in:
 Chemical Abstracts
 AGRICOLA
 EMBASE
 Science Citation Index Expanded
 Scopus
 The Zoological Record

References

External links 
 

Biology journals
Open access journals
Publications established in 2012
Quarterly journals
English-language journals
MDPI academic journals
Creative Commons Attribution-licensed journals